
Year 8 BC was either a common year starting on Friday or Saturday or a leap year starting on Thursday (link will display the full calendar) of the Julian calendar (the sources differ, see leap year error for further information) and a common year starting on Wednesday of the Proleptic Julian calendar. At the time, it was known as the Year of the Consulship of Censorinus and Gaius Asinius (or, less frequently, year 746 Ab urbe condita). The denomination 8 BC for this year has been used since the early medieval period, when the Anno Domini calendar era became the prevalent method in Europe for naming years.

Events

By place

Roman Empire 
 King Maroboduus becomes ruler of the Marcomanni and fights against the Roman Empire's expansion in Bohemia.
 Arminius, son of a Cheruscan chieftain, is taken as a hostage to Rome, where he receives a military education.
 After 20 years, Emperor Augustus initiates his second census of the Roman Empire.
 Sextilis, the eighth month of the early Julian calendar, is renamed Augustus (August) by a decree of the Roman Senate in honor of Augustus.

Births 
 Wang, Chinese empress of the Han Dynasty (d. AD 23)

Deaths 
 November 27 – Horace, Roman lyric poet and writer (b. 65 BC)
 Gaius Maecenas, Roman politician and advisor (b. 70 BC)
 Polemon I, Roman client king of the Bosporan Kingdom
 Xu, Chinese empress of the Han Dynasty

References